Marilyn Jacobs Tenser (6 May 1931 – December 2020) was an American film producer known for her work on independent films of the 1970s through the early 2000s.

Life and career
Jacobs Tenser was the daughter of Crown International Pictures founder, Newton P. Jacobs, and she continued to work for the company as of 2018. She was married to Mark Tenser until his death in 2018.

She died after a short illness in California in December 2020, at the age of 89.

Selected filmography 
 Malibu Spring Break (2003)
 Lena's Holiday (1991) 
 My Mom's a Werewolf (1989) 
 Hunk (1987)
 My Chauffeur (1986)
 Tomboy (1985)
 Weekend Pass (1984)
 My Tutor (1983)
 The Beach Girls (1982)
 Galaxina (1980)
 Van Nuys Blvd. (1979)
 Malibu Beach (1978)
 The Van (1977)
 The Pom Pom Girls (1976)
 Policewomen (1974)
 Superchick (1973)
 Point of Terror (1971)

References 

1931 births
2020 deaths
American film producers
American women film producers
21st-century American women